Hiboka is a monotypic genus of East African armored trapdoor spiders containing the single species, Hiboka geayi. It was first described by L. Fage in 1922, and has only been found on Madagascar. Originally placed with the Ctenizidae, it was moved to the armored trapdoor spiders in 1985.

See also
 List of Idiopidae species

References

External links

Idiopidae
Monotypic Mygalomorphae genera
Mygalomorphae genera
Spiders of Madagascar